Dalin (also Romanized as Dālīn; also known as Dehāli) is a village in Hamaijan Rural District, Hamaijan District, Sepidan County, Fars Province, Iran. At the 2006 census, its population was 2,256, in 509 families.

References 

Populated places in Sepidan County